This is an alphabetical list of the fifty districts of Espoo. Swedish names are given in parentheses.

 Bodom
 Espoon keskus (Esbo centrum)
 Espoonkartano (Esbogård)
 Espoonlahti (Esboviken)
 Gumböle
 Haukilahti (Gäddvik)
 Henttaa (Hemtans)
 Högnäs
 Iivisniemi (Ivisnäs)
 Järvenperä (Träskända)
 Kaitaa (Kaitans)
 Kalajärvi
 Karakallio (Karabacka)
 Karhusuo (Björnkärr)
 Karvasmäki (Karvasbacka)
 Kauklahti (Köklax)
 Kaupunginkallio (Stadsberget)
 Keilaniemi (Kägeludden)
 Kilo
 Kolmperä (Kolmpers)
 Kunnarla (Gunnars)
 Kurttila (Kurtby)
 Kuurinniitty (Kurängen)
 Laajalahti (Bredvik)
 Laaksolahti (Dalsvik)
 Lahnus
 Lakisto
 Latokaski (Ladusved)
 Laurinlahti (Larsvik)
 Leppävaara (Alberga)
 Lintuvaara (Fågelberga)
 Lippajärvi (Klappträsk)
 Luukki (Luk)
 Mankkaa (Mankans)
 Matinkylä (Mattby)
 Muurala (Morby)
 Niipperi (Nipert)
 Niittykumpu (Ängskulla)
 Nupuri (Nupurböle)
 Nuuksio (Noux)
 Nöykkiö (Nöykis)
 Olari (Olars)
 Otaniemi (Otnäs)
 Perusmäki (Grundbacka)
 Pohjois-Tapiola (Norra Hagalund)
 Röylä (Rödskog)
 Saunalahti (Bastvik)
 Sepänkylä (Smedsby)
 Siikajärvi
 Soukka (Sökö)
 Suurpelto (Storåker)
 Suvisaaristo (Sommaröarna)
 Tapiola (Hagalund)
 Vanha-Nuuksio (Gamla Noux)
 Vanhakartano (Gammelgård)
 Vanttila (Fantsby)
 Velskola (Vällskog)
 Viherlaakso (Gröndal)
 Westend

Notes